Robert Byron Hardy (born 16 August 1980) is an English musician and the bassist for the Glasgow-based band Franz Ferdinand with his friend Alex Kapranos.

Biography
Hardy grew up in the outskirts of Bradford and attended Bradford Grammar School. Hardy is an artist with an interest in music while Alex Kapranos is a musician interested in art; this is one of the primary reasons for how their friendship was established. Through Hardy's friends from the Glasgow School of Art, Kapranos developed an interest in the work of the Dadaists and the Russian Constructivists. Many of the earlier shows of the band would come about thanks to the band's art world contacts.

Kapranos was provided with one bass guitar by his friend Mick Cooke, a member of the cult Glaswegian popsters, Belle & Sebastian on the condition that he "did something useful with it". Some time around the end of 2001, Bob Hardy received a bass guitar from Alex Kapranos as Hardy leisured in Kapranos' kitchen in Glasgow. Kapranos conversed with Hardy about mastering the bass guitar.  Kapranos asked Hardy, "Do you want to learn to play the bass then, Bob?". Hardy replied, "No, I'm an artist, not a musician." Alex then responded in saying, "It's the same thing," which amused Hardy at that moment in time and eventually led to him learning the bass. Bob Hardy is also a painter, a vegan, and likes grammar.

Equipment
Hardy plays a 1974 and a 1978 Rickenbacker 4001s / Hagström / Fender Precision. He previously used an SWR Goliath bass cabinet but now uses an Ampeg SVT Pro head and Ampeg 8x10 cabs. He uses Ernie Ball strings – roundwounds, medium gauge. His plectrum is a custom .60 mm magnesium/teflon amalgam.

References

1980 births
Living people
Musicians from Dewsbury
People educated at Bradford Grammar School
English rock bass guitarists
Male bass guitarists
Franz Ferdinand (band) members
Alumni of the Glasgow School of Art
Ivor Novello Award winners
People from Dennistoun
21st-century English bass guitarists
FFS (band) members